The Pont d'Arc (French pont = bridge) is a large natural bridge, located in the Ardèche département in the south of France, 5 km from the town of Vallon-Pont-d'Arc.

It is a very popular canoeing and kayaking area and is heavily visited by tourists. It is usually described as the natural entrance to the Ardèche Canyon.

In the near vicinity of the arch is the Chauvet-Pont-d'Arc Cave, containing one of the earliest known Paleolithic cave paintings, about 30,000 years old (featured in the 3D documentary Cave of Forgotten Dreams by film director Werner Herzog).

References

See also

 Chauvet Cave

Natural arches of France
Landforms of Ardèche
Tourist attractions in Ardèche
Rock formations of France
Landforms of Auvergne-Rhône-Alpes